El precio del cielo is a Mexican telenovela produced by Televisa and originally transmitted by Telesistema Mexicano.

Cast 
 Miguel Manzano
 María Tereza Montoya
 Luis Beristain
 Malú Gatica
 Bárbara Gil
 Ismael Larumbe
 Juan Salido
 Bertha Moss
 Ada Carrasco

References

External links 

Mexican telenovelas
Televisa telenovelas
1959 telenovelas
1959 Mexican television series debuts
1959 Mexican television series endings
Spanish-language telenovelas